Alexandre "Alex" Guyodo (19 June 1922 – 7 April 2014) was a French steeplechaser who competed in the 1948 Summer Olympics.

References

1922 births
2014 deaths
French male middle-distance runners
Olympic athletes of France
Athletes (track and field) at the 1948 Summer Olympics
French male steeplechase runners